Lake Martignano (Italian: Lago di Martignano), is a small lake in Lazio, Italy  north-north-west of Rome, in an extinct crater or maar.
Administratively its coast is divided amongst the municipalities of Rome, Anguillara Sabazia and Campagnano di Roma.

Overview
In ancient times Lake Martignano was part of southern Etruria and called Alsietinus Lacus. Augustus drew from it the Aqua Alsietina; the water was hardly fit to drink, and was mainly intended to supply his naumachia (lake made for a sham naval battle) at Rome, near San Francesco a Ripa, on the right bank of the Tiber, where some traces of the aqueduct were perhaps found in 1720. The course of the aqueduct, which was mainly subterranean, is practically unknown: Frontinus tells us that it received a branch from Lake Bracciano near Careiae (Galera): and an inscription relating to it was found in this district in 1887.

There is a lawn beach, lake-side cafes and restaurants, and walking tracks.

Nearby towns
Campagnano di Roma
Bracciano
Anguillara Sabazia
Trevignano Romano
Oriolo Romano
Sutri
Capranica
Cesano

Notes

References

Attribution:

Further reading

Lakes of Lazio
Province of Viterbo